Ste-Anne is a Catholic church located at 528 Old St. Patrick Street in the Lowertown neighbourhood of Ottawa, Ontario, Canada. Built in 1873 by architect J.P. LeCourt, it is one of the few examples of traditional Québécois church architecture in Ontario. Ste-Anne is the home of St. Clement Parish, a  bilingual parish community served by the Priestly Fraternity of Saint Peter, which celebrates the Mass and other sacraments in Latin according to the liturgical norms of the 1962 Roman Missal.

History

Bishop Joseph-Bruno Guigues was responsible for the creation of the church, as by the 1870s Ottawa's French Catholic population outgrew the Notre-Dame Cathedral. Pierre Rocque worked as the contractor and assisted LeCourt in the construction. Bishop Guigues laid the cornerstone on May 4, 1873.

In April 2009, part of the roof collapsed, resulting in an 18-month restoration costing more than $1 million. Eight months after the church reopened, it was closed again by the Archdiocese of Ottawa due to dwindling attendance and economic problems. Archbishop Terrence Prendergast offered the building to the community of St. Clement Parish, which agreed to the move and began holding Masses at Ste-Anne's on June 3, 2012.

Heritage Designation
Ste-Anne Catholic Church is a designated heritage property under Part IV of the Ontario Heritage Act. It is commemorated by the City of Ottawa with the following plaque:

Architecture

The building features a plain stone facade with a medieval-inspired rose window. The doors, windows, and three statuary niches contain classical rounded arches. A detailed three-tiered belfry tops contrasts with the simple stone facade.

See also

 List of designated heritage properties in Ottawa

References

Roman Catholic churches in Ottawa
Roman Catholic churches in Ontario
Designated heritage properties in Ottawa
Roman Catholic churches completed in 1873
19th-century Roman Catholic church buildings in Canada